Out with a Bang is the debut studio album of American country music artist David Lee Murphy. It features the hit single "Dust on the Bottle", which reached Number One on the Billboard Hot Country Singles & Tracks in late 1995. The track "High Weeds and Rust" was previously recorded by Doug Stone on his 1990 self-titled debut album. "Just Once" is also included on the soundtrack to the 1994 movie 8 Seconds. The album was certified Platinum by the RIAA for sales of 1,000,000.

Track listing
All tracks written or co-written by David Lee Murphy. Co-writers are named in parentheses.

"Can't Turn It Off" – 3:23
"Party Crowd" (Jimbeau Hinson) – 3:18
"Mama 'n Them" (Michael Woody) – 3:23
"High Weeds and Rust" – 2:55
"Fish Ain't Bitin'" – 2:46
"Out with a Bang" (Kim Tribble) – 2:28
"Greatest Show on Earth" – 4:11
"Dust on the Bottle" – 3:44
"Just Once" (Tribble) – 2:59
"Why Can't People Just Get Along" (Minnie Pearl) – 3:54

Personnel
Adapted from liner notes.

Richard Bennett – acoustic guitar on "Just Once"
Mike Brignardello – bass guitar
Chad Cromwell – drums
Kenny Edwards – acoustic guitar
Paul Franklin – steel guitar, pedabro
John Barlow Jarvis – piano on "Just Once"
Liana Manis – background vocals
Brent Mason – electric guitar
Terry McMillan – harmonica, tambourine
David Lee Murphy – lead vocals, background vocals, acoustic guitar
Steve Nathan – piano, organ, Wurlitzer
Kim Tribble – background vocals

Charts

Weekly charts

Year-end charts

Certifications

References

1995 debut albums
Albums produced by Tony Brown (record producer)
MCA Records albums
David Lee Murphy albums